MidCity District (formerly known as MidCity Huntsville for a brief period of time) is a mixed-use retail development center currently being built in Huntsville, Alabama on the corner of University Drive (US 72) and Research Park Boulevard (SR-255) on the land formerly used for Madison Square Mall. It is expected to be completed in 2032.
MidCity's first official phase opened with Topgolf and a preview center/entertainment venue called The Camp at MidCity.

Timeline

2017
The former Madison Square Mall property was sold to The Grove LLC for $5 Million in April 2015. After two more years of business, the mall was closed and began demolition in February 2017. 
Demolition lasted several months, concluding sometime in June. 
As demolition began to slow down, construction of Topgolf began in April. National Real Estate Investor listed MidCity as one of the 12 largest retail developments underway slated for delivery in 2017 or 2018.
In June, it was announced that High Point Climbing and Fitness would be coming to Midcity Huntsville, with construction beginning sometime in the fall. 
A smaller project, The Camp at Midcity, which is a small music and arts venue, was developed on the former Lone Star Grill property. It opened on August 9.
Topgolf opened December 22, 2017.

2018
In February 2018, it was announced that Dave & Buster's would be opening in July 2019.
There was also the announcement of a Wahlburgers opening sometime in the future as well. 
In March 2018, it was announced that RCP companies had brought in Mark Taft to plan multiple restaurants and eating locations throughout Midcity.

Sometime in late 2018, construction on High Point Climbing and Fitness began, as well as Dave and Buster's.

2019
On April 25, 2019, High Point Climbing and Fitness opened.

On April 30, 2019, the official name was changed from MidCity Huntsville to MidCity District.

On August 10, 2019, Dave & Buster's opened.

In November, REI Co-Op opened.

In December, it was announced that the Touchstar Cinemas Madison Square 12 would be replaced with a brand new venue, featuring the largest movie screen in Alabama. The new theater is scheduled to open in 2022.

2020

In January, it was announced that a Hotel Indigo would be developed on MidCity property, which is slated to feature 120 rooms and is planned for opening in mid-2021.

In February, RCP Companies announced two new food venues for the MidCity development. Kung Fu Tea, a bubble tea shop; and Kamado Ramen, an upscale traditional Ramen restaurant. Also announced was Color Me Mine, which will be an interactive art experience allowing customers to decorate their own ceramics.

In August, AL.com reported that local artist Logan Tanner will be creating a mural in dedication to the late Little Richard, which is set to appear on the Wahlburger's planned to open in the district.

2021

In March, MidCity District broke ground on its first multi-family project, Metronome Apartments.

In July, Huntsville awarded MidCity the honor of becoming its next entertainment "purple cup" district. Patrons will be able to walk the district with a "purple cup," allowing them to enjoy an alcoholic beverage outside establishments.

In August, MidCity welcomed a new mural - Unity is Love - by Ase Sela, located behind Kamado Ramen.

In September, Trader Joe's officially opened to the public.

In December, MidCity broke ground on its newest project, Blue Oak BBQ, an award-winning BBQ restaurant based out of New Orleans.

2022

In February, artist Morgan Echols completed a colorful, geometric shipping container mural next to Kamado Ramen.

In May, The Orion Amphitheater held its Grand Opening and celebrated with the community with The First Waltz.

The Salt Factory Pub also opened in May.

References

Retail buildings in Alabama